Emperor Ningzong of Song (19 November 1168 – 17 September 1224), personal name Zhao Kuo, was the 13th emperor of the Song dynasty of China and the fourth emperor of the Southern Song dynasty. He reigned from 1194 until his death in 1224.

He was the second son and the only surviving child of his predecessor Guangzong and like his father, Ningzong was weak-minded; easily dominated by women. During Ningzong's reign, he had built 75 commemorative shrines and steles, the most in Song history. He was a great patron of art, promoting artists such as Liang Kai and Ma Yuan to painter-in-waiting and writing poems about their paintings. Upon Ningzong's death, a minor official and a relative of Ningzong became Emperor Lizong.

Reign 
He was noted for the cultural and intellectual achievements made during his reign. In particular, Zhu Xi wrote some of his most famous Neo-Confucianist works during this period. However, Emperor Ningzong was known for his aversion towards the spread of Neo-Confucianism in his imperial court due to the influence of his chancellor Han Tuozhou and on the political side, however, Emperor Ningzong saw his government being plagued by rising inflation that threatened the economy and the military advances by the Jurchens from the north during the wars between the Song dynasty and Jurchen-led Jin dynasty.

In absence of a son, he adopted a relative named Zhao Xun in 1197 who was only 6 years old.

In 1198, Neo-Confucianism was banned for two years until the ban was repelled in 1202.

Song Invasion of Jin 
As the Jin were weakening because of natural disasters, Ningzong's chancellor Han Tuozhou continually provoked the weak Jin by launching raids. War against the Jin was officially declared on June 14, 1206, by Han Tuozhou. The war was a disaster. Despite the Jin's weakness due to the natural disasters, it had countered the attacks from the Song and even counter-attacked. To make things worse, Ningzong was not interested in the war effort and morale was low. There was not enough supplies and many of the army deserted. Wu Xi (吳曦; d. 1207), the governor-general of Sichuan, defected to the Jin in December 1206. This was bad, as Wu was holding the western front, however, Song loyalists assassinated Wu on March 29, 1207, before Jin troops could take control of the surrendered territories. Fighting continued in 1207, but by the end of that year the war was at a stalemate. The Song was now on the defensive, while the Jin failed to make gains in Song territory. The failure of Han Tuozhou's aggressive policies led to his demise. On December 15, 1207, Han was beaten to death by the Imperial Palace Guards.

Peace 
A peace treaty was signed on November 2, 1208, and the Song tribute to the Jin was reinstated. The Song annual indemnity increased by 50,000 taels of silver and 50,000 packs of fabric. The treaty also stipulated that the Song had to present to the Jin the head of Han Tuozhou, who the Jin held responsible for starting the war. The heads of Han and Su were severed from their exhumed corpses, exhibited to the public, then delivered to the Jin finally ending the war.

In 1210, The Mongols, formerly a Jin tributary, ended their vassalage and attacked the Jin in 1211. In light of this event, the Song court debated ending tributary payments to the weakened Jin, but they chose to avoid antagonizing the Jin. As the Mongols expanded, the Jin suffered territorial losses and attacked the Song in 1217 to compensate for their shrinking territory. The Jin continued attacking the Song until they agreed to a peace treaty and the Jin returned home. However, the Song would never regain their lost land.

In 1220, his adopted heir Zhao Xun died from dysentery. Zhao Xun was only 29 years old. Shi Miyuan decided when Ningzong died, another relative named Zhao Hong was to succeed him but Zhao Hong was never placed as heir-apparent due to conflicts with Shi Miyuan and when Ningzong died, he was replaced by Zhao Yun, the future Emperor Lizong.

He fell ill before dying a few days later in 1224. Ningzong may have been poisoned; it is also worth mentioning that Ningzong was physically weak as a nearly emaciated which suggested physical ailments of some gravity was shown in his official portrait. He was succeeded by another relative named Zhao Yun as all of Ningzong's children died young without any clear evidence of fowl play who later became Emperor Lizong.

The Emperor's woman 
He was a good monarch but sickly at times and this let his wife the Empress Yang Exploit his inadequacies and become the de facto ruler of the Empire for nearly 30 years

Family
Consorts and Issue:
 Empress Gongshu, of the Han clan (1165–1200)
 Zhao Jun, Prince Yanchonghui (1196), second son
 Zhao Tan, Prince Bin (1200), third son
 Empress Gongsheng, of the Yang clan (1162–1233), personal name Guizhi
 Zhao Zeng, Prince Ying (1200–1201), fourth son
 Zhao Jiong, Prince Hua (1202), fifth son
 Jieyu, of the Cao clan
 Princess Yuping
 Married Lin Cun
 Furen, of the Zhong clan
 Zhao Qi, Prince Shun (1207), sixth son
 Zhao Zhi, Prince Shen (1207), seventh son
 Unknown
 Zhao Ji, Prince Su (1208), eighth son
 Zhao Zhi, Prince Pi (1223), ninth son
 Princess Qi, first daughter

Adopted Issue:
 Zhao Xun, Crown Prince Jingxian (1192–1220)
 Zhao Hong, Prince Zhenzhaosu (d. 1225)
 Zhao Yun, Lizong (1205–1264)

Ancestry

See also 
 Chinese emperors family tree (middle)
 List of emperors of the Song dynasty
 Architecture of the Song dynasty
 Culture of the Song dynasty
 Economy of the Song dynasty
 History of the Song dynasty
 Society of the Song dynasty
 Technology of the Song dynasty

References

Citations

Sources 

 
 
 
 

1168 births
1224 deaths
Southern Song emperors
12th-century Chinese monarchs
13th-century Chinese monarchs
People from Hangzhou